Acanthochitina is an extinct genus of chitinozoans. It was described by Alfred Eisenack in 1931. It contains a single species, Acanthochitina barbata.

References

Prehistoric marine animals
Fossil taxa described in 1931